Ionview is a surface light rail transit (LRT) stop under construction on Line 5 Eglinton, a new line that is part of the Toronto subway system. It will be located in the Ionview neighbourhood at the intersection of Eglinton Avenue and Ionview Road. It is scheduled to open in 2023.

The stop is located in the middle of Eglinton Avenue on the west side of its intersection with Ionview Road. The stop has parallel side platforms to be accessed from the pedestrian crossing on the west side of the signalized street intersection.

Surface connections 

, the following are the proposed connecting routes that would serve this station when Line 5 Eglinton opens:

References

External links
Ionview at the Crosstown project website

Line 5 Eglinton stations